One Flew Over the Cuckoo's Nest (1963) is a play based on Ken Kesey's 1962 novel of the same name.

Productions
Dale Wasserman's stage adaptation, with music by Teiji Ito, made its Broadway preview on November 12, 1963, its premiere on November 13, and ran until January 25, 1964 for a total of one preview and 82 performances. Since then, the play has had two revivals: first off-Broadway in 1971, directed by Lee Sankowich with Danny DeVito as Martini, then as a Broadway production in 2001 with Gary Sinise as McMurphy. The film version One Flew Over the Cuckoo's Nest was released in 1975 and was based on the play, not on the novel. DeVito reprised his stage role in the film.

The 1963–64 Broadway production starred Kirk Douglas as Randle Patrick McMurphy, Gene Wilder as Billy Bibbit, William Daniels as Harding, Ed Ames as "Chief" Bromden, Al Nesor as Martini, and Joan Tetzel as Nurse Ratched. Douglas retained the rights to make a film version of One Flew Over the Cuckoo's Nest for a decade, but was unable to find a studio willing to make it with him. Eventually, he gave the rights to his son Michael, who succeeded in getting the film produced. At that time, Kirk Douglas was deemed too old for the role of McMurphy, and the role was given to Jack Nicholson.

In 1982 Greg Hersov directed a production at the Royal Exchange, Manchester with Jonathan Hackett as Randle McMurphy, Linda Marlowe as Nurse Ratched and Tim McInnerny as Billy Bibbitt.

In April 1988, the Playhouse Theatre was the site for the first London production of One Flew Over the Cuckoo's Nest. The play was brought to the London stage by Cuckoo Productions, formed by Diane Hilton, Karin Parnaby, and Judy Kershaw.  They raised £100,000 in 24 hours to bring the play to the London theatre.

In 2001, the Steppenwolf Theatre Company produced a Broadway revival, winning the Tony Award for Best Play Revival. This production was directed by Terry Kinney and starred Gary Sinise, Amy Morton, Tim Sampson (playing Chief, his father Will Sampson's role in the film version), Eric Johner, and Ross Lehman.

In 2004, Guy Masterson and Nica Burns mounted a production at the Edinburgh Fringe Festival with Christian Slater, Mackenzie Crook and Frances Barber and a cast of comedians including Owen O'Neill. Masterson famously resigned as director & co-producer just prior to opening citing "ill health" and the production was finally delivered by Terry Johnson and Tamara Harvey. The show was a huge box office hit and transferred to London's Gielgud Theatre where it ran for over 20 weeks. This production was itself revived in 2006 with Alex Kingston taking over the role of Nurse Ratched. It then toured the UK in 2007 with Shane Richie playing McMurphy and Sophie Ward as Nurse Ratched.

A production of the play was staged by London's Tower Theatre Company from 23–27 October 2012 at Upstairs at the Gatehouse, Highgate, London.

In 2018, After Hours Theatre Company in Los Angeles created an immersive version of the work. The Oregon State Hospital was recreated in a 7,000 sq. ft. warehouse in Burbank. Each audience member was provided a costume and a patient wristband. During the immersive pre-show, audience members were tasked with finding clues as to why they have been admitted to the hospital that eventually led them to join the patient revolution. This production was nominated for 6 Ovation Awards, including a win for Best Lighting Design, Intimate Theatre.

In 2022, an Australian Adaptation of Dale Wasserman's play, directed by Chris McRae was created by Luke Miller, Chris McRae and Samuel Yombich Pilot-Kickett, and performed by Darlington Theatre Players in Perth, Western Australia. The adaptation recontextualised the play to 1960s Australia, with the reimagining of the "Chief" Bromden character as a local Aboriginal man, as well as some adjustment of language to fit the Australian idiom. The production included musical composition by Kieran Ridgway, with the inclusion of didgeridoo and didgeribone as part of the underscoring to reflect the new setting.

Awards and nominations

2001 Broadway revival

See also 
One Flew Over the Cuckoo's Nest (novel)
One Flew Over the Cuckoo's Nest (film)

References

External links 
 
 
 One Flew Over the Cuckoo's Nest at ThatTheatreSite Provides character descriptions and updated audition listings.
  Original Production's ITDb
  1971 revival's ITDb
  2001 revival's ITDb

1963 plays
Broadway plays
Plays based on novels
Works set in psychiatric hospitals
Psychiatry in the United States in fiction
One Flew Over the Cuckoo's Nest